Sable Aviation (legal name Sable Aviation 44 60 Incorporated) is an on-demand aircraft charter company operating from the Gateway Facilities hangar/FBO at the Halifax Stanfield International Airport whose primary role is to provide fixed wing service to Sable Island.

Sable Aviation began operations in June 2016, although the same aircraft and pilot had been flying to Sable Island since 2006 with another locally based company.  Sable Aviation operates a Britten-Norman Islander BN-2A-21, with an oversize tire modification that allows it to land safely on the sandy south beach of Sable. The flights run year-round on an as-needed basis, providing support to the Sable Island Station by bringing out supplies, station personnel, researchers, contractors, etc.  Sable Aviation also flies out tourist groups who are interested in visiting the Sable Island National Park Reserve.

See also
Sable Island Aerodrome

References

External links
Sable Aviation 44 60 Inc
Halifax Stanfield International Airport

Airlines established in 2016
Regional airlines of Atlantic Canada
Sable Island